The 1980 PBA season was the sixth season of the Philippine Basketball Association (PBA).

Season highlights
The three-point field goal was introduced at the start of the year.
From July 3 to 7, two PBA selections hosted the visiting Golden State Warriors in a series of exhibition games. Their four-game series ends in a tie with two wins apiece.
The U/tex Wranglers wins the Open Conference title by beating Toyota in overtime, 99–98 in the deciding fifth game, best remembered for the famous "Last 16 seconds" when coach Tommy Manotoc's team wiped out a four-point deficit with 16 seconds left in regulation and winning in the extension period.
Nicholas Stoodley/USA wins the Invitational Championship with a two-game sweep over Toyota Tamaraws to become the first foreign team to capture a PBA title. 
The season-ending tournament marked the Crispa Redmanizers' incredible 20–1 record in the All-Filipino Conference, winning their first 19 games and almost completed a conference sweep, if not for Toyota's victory in Game 3 of the finals, which saw the dismissal of their head coach Fort Acuña.

Opening ceremonies
The muses for the participating teams are as follows:

Champions
 Open Conference: U/Tex Wranglers
 Invitational Championship: Nicholas Stoodley USA
 All-Filipino Conference: Crispa Redmanizers
 Team with best win–loss percentage: Crispa Redmanizers (44–15, .746)
 Best Team of the Year: Crispa Redmanizers (3rd)

Individual awards
 Most Valuable Player: Philip Cezar (Crispa)
 Rookie of the Year:  Willie Generalao (Gilbey's Gin)
 Mythical Five:
Robert Jaworski (Toyota)
Atoy Co (Crispa)
Ramon Fernandez (Toyota)
Bogs Adornado (U/Tex)
Philip Cezar (Crispa)

Cumulative standings

References

 
PBA